The High Commission of India in London is the diplomatic mission of India in the United Kingdom. It is located in India House on Aldwych, between Bush House, what was Marconi House (now Citibank) and Australia House. It faces both the London School of Economics and King's College London. Since 1981, India House is a Grade II listed building.

History

In 1919, a committee chaired by the Marquess of Crewe determined there existed the need to separate the agency work of the India Office from its other political and administrative roles, and recommended the transfer of all such work to "a High Commissioner for India or some similar Indian Governmental Representative in London." It was also felt popular opinion in India would view this as a step towards full Dominion status for India. The Government of India Act 1919 upheld the recommendations of the committee, making provision for "the appointment of a High Commissioner by His Majesty by Order in Council, which might delegate to the official any of the contractual powers of the Secretary of State [for India] in Council, and prescribe the conditions under which he should act on behalf of the Government of India or any Provincial Government."

On 13 August 1920, King-Emperor George V issued the required Order in Council. Until India became independent in 1947, the post was styled "High Commissioner for India". The first High Commissioner for India was Indian Civil Service officer Sir William Stevenson Meyer; the first of Indian origin was Sir Dadiba Merwanji Dalal. The High Commissioner enjoyed the same status as his counterparts from the British Dominions. Upon Indian independence the post was given the present designation.

Proposed in 1925 by the Indian High Commissioner Sir Atul Chatterjee, the building was designed by Sir Herbert Baker and completed in 1930. It was formally inaugurated on 8 July 1930 by the King-Emperor George V.

A bust of Jawaharlal Nehru was unveiled by Prime Minister John Major in 1991.

Emblems
There are twelve emblems on the outside of the building representing the various provinces of India (under the British Raj), described as follows:

See also

 India–United Kingdom relations
 Foreign relations of India
 Foreign relations of the United Kingdom
 List of diplomatic missions of India
 List of diplomatic missions in the United Kingdom

Gallery

References

External links

 Official site

London
India
Government buildings completed in 1930
India and the Commonwealth of Nations
United Kingdom and the Commonwealth of Nations
India–United Kingdom relations
Herbert Baker buildings and structures
Grade II listed buildings in the City of Westminster
Aldwych
Buildings and structures completed in 1930